Alexandre "Alex" Oliva, is a Brazilian free software activist, developer, former vice president of the board of directors of the Free Software Foundation (FSF)  and founding member of Free Software Foundation Latin America (FSFLA). He is currently on-hold from his PhD studies at the Institute of Computing of the State University of Campinas, Brazil whilst working as a compiler engineer at Red Hat, contributing in the GCC compiler. He is the maintainer of Linux-libre, a fork of the Linux kernel which removes non-free software components, such as binary blobs from the kernel. The Linux-libre kernels are used in Linux distributions such as Parabola GNU/Linux-libre, gNewSense, and Trisquel, all of which are recommended by the Free Software Foundation and the GNU Project.

In 2008, Oliva translated and produced "O Porco e a Caixa", a Brazilian Portuguese translation of "The Pig and the Box" - a Creative Commons-licensed book that teaches the perils of DRM to children. Over 10,000 copies were eventually printed by the FISL conference in Porto Alegre, Brazil.

He is an official GNU and Free Software Speaker. He is also one of the voting members of the FSF.

References

External links

 Personal site
 Blog at FSFLA

Brazilian activists
Year of birth missing (living people)
GNU people
Free software programmers
Linux people
Living people
Red Hat employees